Lee Seung-yeop may refer to:
 Yi Sung-yop (1905–1954), North Korean politician
 Lee Seung-yuop, South Korean baseball player and manager
 Lee Seung-yeop (footballer), South Korean footballer